James Renny, D.D. (died 26 July 1894) was a bishop of the Reformed Episcopal Church in England. He was consecrated as bishop for the Free Church of England on 24 June 1892 at Emmanuel Church, Gunnersbury, London.

See also 
 List of bishops of the Reformed Episcopal Church

References 

 Annie Darling Price, A History of the Formation and Growth of the Reformed Episcopal Church, 1873-1902, p. 264-281. Available at https://books.google.com/books?id=BucTAAAAYAAJ&printsec=frontcover

Year of birth missing
1894 deaths
Bishops of the Reformed Episcopal Church